The Olé Football Academy, commonly referred to as Olé, is a national association football centre based in the suburb of Porirua in Wellington, New Zealand. Considered the premier football academy in New Zealand, Olé are currently represented at the senior level by Central Premier League side Western Suburbs, and have produced a number of New Zealand internationals in both men's and women's football. Founded in 1997 by Dave Wilson and his son, Michael, the academy was directed by Declan Edge from 2012 to 2020. Since 2020 the Technical Director has been Ben Sippola.

Olé Football Academy shares a current partnership with Team Wellington, sending academy prospects to the club to gain top-tier experience in the ISPS Handa Premiership. Prior to this, Olé partnered with ISPS Handa Premiership club Eastern Suburbs for the 2018–19 season, in which Eastern Suburbs won the title for the first time in their history – a success largely attributed to the Olé academy, whose graduates consisted of the majority of the team. Internationally, Olé have formed a partnership with Swedish club Torslanda IK, now coached by Edge; players and coaches are exchanged regularly.

Notable graduates
The academy's two most notable graduates are current PSV Eindhoven midfielder Ryan Thomas and Beşiktaş winger Tyler Boyd. Others listed are either current internationals, or have represented a professional team outside New Zealand following graduation from Olé Football Academy.

References

External links
 Olé Football Academy website

1997 establishments in New Zealand
Association football academies